Ayfer Yılmaz (born 1956) is a Turkish female former high-level civil servant, a politician and former government minister.

Private life
Ayfer Yılmaz was born in Ankara, Turkey in 1956. After completing the high school, she studied at Ankara University graduating from the Faculty of Political Science.

She is mother of one.

Civil servant
Her first occupation was deputy consultant for Economy and Trade at the Turkish Embassy in Bonn, Federal Republic of Germany. She was then 
assigned to the Undersecretariat of Treasury to serve as the Director General of Public Finance Department, Deputy Undersecretary, and finally as the Undersecretary, the head of the administration. Her following occupations were chairperson of the board at the Turkish branches of World Bank, Asian Development Bank, European Bank for Reconstruction and Development and Islamic Development Bank.

Politician
Yılmaz entered politics from the True Path Party (DYP). On the 1995 general election, she was elected into the 20th Parliament of Turkey as a deputy of Mersin Province. In the 1999 general election, she was re-elected. She served as Minister of State in the 53rd (6 March 1996 – 28 June 1996) and 54th governments (28 June 1996 – 30 June 1997).

Consultant
Between 2002 and 2009, Yılmaz was the secretary general of the Strategic Research Center at the Başkent University in Ankara.She served as the member of the advisory board of the International Relations Department at the Okan University in Istanbul.

Back to politics
In October 2017, Yılmaz joined the founders of the Good Party led by Meral Akşener. She is a member of the board of founders undertaking the portfolio of "International Relations".

References

Living people
1956 births
Politicians from Ankara
Ankara University Faculty of Political Sciences alumni
Turkish women civil servants
Turkish civil servants
20th-century Turkish women politicians
Democrat Party (Turkey, current) politicians
Deputies of Mersin
Members of the 20th Parliament of Turkey
Members of the 21st Parliament of Turkey
Ministers of State of Turkey
Women government ministers of Turkey
Government ministers of Turkey
Members of the 53rd government of Turkey
Members of the 54th government of Turkey
Good Party politicians